"Space Truckin'" is a song by British hard rock band Deep Purple. It is the seventh and final track on the Machine Head album and its lyrics talk of space travel.

Guitarist Ritchie Blackmore claims in Classic Albums: Deep Purple – The Making of Machine Head that the song composition started with the half-step riffs in the refrain, which were inspired by the theme music for the Batman TV programme composed by Neal Hefti. Blackmore asked singer Ian Gillan if he could write any lyrics over the riff, and the rest of the song evolved from there.

Live performances
When it was first performed live, the band appended an instrumental that was originally part of the song "Mandrake Root" from their first album but gradually evolved into a showcase for Jon Lord's Hammond organ and Ritchie Blackmore's guitar solos. This usually took the length of the overall song to over twenty minutes, and it was always performed as the last number of the main set. A good example of this arrangement can be found on the Made in Japan album, wherein Blackmore also quotes the "cello" solo of "Fools" off Fireball.

Jon Lord played his solo through a ring modulator or played some of it on an ARP synthesizer. Meanwhile, Ritchie Blackmore usually split the guitar solo into two halves, a quiet section with just drums, then a loud section with the full band. The second half was often when Blackmore would smash his guitar, play it with his feet or throw it into the air. One of the most infamous incidents where that happened was at the California Jam festival in 1974, where he dropped one guitar over the edge of the stage, smashed a second against a TV camera, then set his amplifier on fire, which then subsequently exploded.

When Deep Purple reformed in 1984, this extended arrangement was reworked, and later included snippets of other songs.

During the Man of All Ages tour, the final part of the song, which originally featured high-pitched screaming by Gillan (now 71), instead featured high-pitched guitar in the same key as his original vocals.

On the remastered version of their 1982 album Live in London (recorded in 1974), there is a 31-minute-long live version of the song. It consists of a lot of improvising from the band members and in one part of the song they play the main riff from "Child in Time".

Cover versions 
 British heavy metal band Iron Maiden has contributed cover of "Space Truckin'" for the tribute album Re-Machined: A Tribute to Deep Purple's Machine Head to celebrate the 40th anniversary of Deep Purple's 1972 release Machine Head.
 American guitarist Ace Frehley has covered "Space Truckin'" for his 2020 album Origins Vol. 2.
 Dream Theater covered this and the whole Made in Japan album.
 Arjen Anthony Lucassen's Star One covered the song during their 2002 European tour, as seen on the Live on Earth DVD.
 American thrash metal band Overkill included a cover of the song on their 1999 album, Coverkill.
 Serbian hard rock band Cactus Jack released a cover on their 2003 Deep Purple Tribute album.
 American industrial metal band Ministry include their version of the song in the all-covers album Cover Up.
 Tesla's version is the first track on their album Real to Reel.
 American thrash metal band Vengeance Rising covered the song on their 1990 album Once Dead.
 William Shatner covered the song on his album Seeking Major Tom.
 Kraus covered this song in 2011.
 American punk band The Meatmen covered the song as a bonus track on the 2008 re-issue of their album, Pope on a Rope.
 A Sound of Thunder included a cover of the song on their 2016 album, Who Do You Think We Are?.
 Spock's Beard often played the song as an encore on their 2000 tour. They included a recording on their live album There and Here.
 Kip Winger and Tony MacAlpine covered this song, and it is included in the 1994 album, Smoke on the Water: A Tribute to Deep Purple.

In pop culture
The intro was featured on the TV show WKRP in Cincinnati, on the episode "The Airplane Show". (Syndicated reruns of the episode replaced the track with generic music.)
The song is a downloadable track for the Rock Band series of music video games as of 30 December 2008.
The song appeared in the film Lords of Dogtown, the documentary Warren Miller's Dynasty and the video game Guitar Hero: Van Halen.
The 1997 remix of the song was featured in the first and last episodes of Ash vs Evil Dead.
"Space Truckin'" played in orbit as a wake-up call for the Red Team on Flight Day 3 of the crew of STS-107; it was specially played for Mission Specialist Kalpana Chawla, who was later one of the seven crew killed in the Space Shuttle Columbia disaster. A fan of the band, she traded e-mails with group members while in space. Guitarist Steve Morse, vocalist Ian Gillan, bass guitarist Roger Glover, drummer Ian Paice and keyboardist Don Airey were recording Bananas when the disaster occurred. Chawla had taken three CDs onboard Columbia: Deep Purple's landmark 1972 album Machine Head, 1996's Purpendicular and Rainbow's 1979 album Down to Earth (Glover and Airey were members of Rainbow at the time). To honor her, Deep Purple closed Bananas with "Contact Lost".
The song was used in naming the Stand ability of Kaato Higashikata in Part 8 of Jojo's Bizarre Adventure, JoJolion.
"Basically, this is 'Smoke On The Water', but in space," remarked Tim Wheeler of Ash. "All Deep Purple's songs seem to be about being in a gang and, true to form, this is too – but, this time, they're intergalactic travellers. The lyrics are utter nonsense, but it doesn't matter. It's just a real stomper of a song with a great riff. I like Jon Lord's organ sound. It's so distorted, it's like a guitar."

Personnel
Ian Gillan – vocals
Ritchie Blackmore – guitar
Roger Glover – bass guitar
Jon Lord – keyboards
Ian Paice – drums, percussion

References 

Deep Purple songs
1972 songs
Songs written by Ian Gillan
Songs written by Roger Glover
Songs written by Ritchie Blackmore
Songs written by Jon Lord
Songs written by Ian Paice
Songs about spaceflight
List songs